Native Canadians may refer to:

First Nations in Canada, a term of ethnicity that refers to the indigenous peoples in what is now Canada who are neither Inuit nor Métis people
Native Canadians (album), by the band Fiasco